Montfort Stokes (March 12, 1762November 4, 1842) was an American Democratic (originally Democratic-Republican) politician who served as U.S. Senator from 1816 to 1823, and the 25th Governor of North Carolina from 1830 to 1832.

Biography 
Born in Lunenburg County in the Colony of Virginia, Stokes was the youngest of the eleven children of David Stokes, a military officer and judge. At the age of 13, he enlisted in the United States Merchant Marine.  During the American Revolutionary War, Stokes was captured by the British and confined for seven months on the British prison ship Jersey in New York Harbor. He later held the rank of major general in the state militia from 1804 to 1816.

After the Revolutionary War, Stokes settled in Salisbury, North Carolina, farmed, served as clerk of court, and studied law.  There, he first met Andrew Jackson, a fellow lawyer. He served as assistant clerk in the North Carolina Senate from 1786 to 1790, and as clerk from 1799 to 1816, until he was elected to the United States Senate following the resignation of James Turner. He served the remaining few months of Turner's term and then a full term in the Senate, but was defeated for re-election by the legislature in 1823.  He had previously been elected to the Senate in 1804, but had declined the seat.  During his Senate term Stokes changed his residency from Salisbury to Wilkesboro, North Carolina, in the foothills of the Blue Ridge Mountains.

Stokes was then elected to the North Carolina General Assembly; he represented Wilkes County in the North Carolina Senate from 1826 to 1827 and the North Carolina House of Commons from 1829 to 1830.

In 1830, Stokes was elected Governor by the General Assembly on the ninth ballot, defeating Cadwallader Jones and Richard Dobbs Spaight, Jr.  Stokes faced Spaight for re-election again the following year and was elected by a narrow margin (98–93). During his term in office, Stokes supported construction of canals along the North Carolina Coast; he simultaneously served as president of the University of North Carolina Board of Trustees.

A strong supporter of President Andrew Jackson, Governor Stokes urged the state legislature to support Jackson's anti-nullification position; Stokes was named by Jackson to head the Federal Indian Commission, overseeing relocation and resettlement of Indian tribes from the American southeast, and resigned as governor on November 19, 1832.

With his new position, Stokes moved to Fort Gibson in the Arkansas Territory (now part of the state of Oklahoma) and advocated for the Cherokee, Seneca, Shawnee, and Quapaw tribes. He died in November 1842 and is buried near Fort Gibson. Stokes is believed to be the only soldier of the American Revolutionary War buried in Oklahoma.

In 1943, a United States Liberty ship named the SS Montfort Stokes was launched. She was scrapped in 1962.

Family 
Stokes first married Mary Irwin and they had one daughter. After his wife died, he married Rachel Montgomery (1776–1862) and they had five sons and five daughters. His son, Montfort Sidney Stokes, fought as major in the Mexican–American War and died in 1862 in the Civil War as colonel of the 1st North Carolina Infantry Regiment.

References

 Biographical Directory of the Governors of the United States, 1789–1978, Robert Sobel and John Raimo, eds. Westport, CT: Meckler Books, 1978.

1762 births
1842 deaths
People from Lunenburg County, Virginia
North Carolina Democratic-Republicans
North Carolina Jacksonians
Democratic Party governors of North Carolina
United States senators from North Carolina
Democratic Party members of the North Carolina House of Representatives
Democratic Party North Carolina state senators
American sailors
Democratic-Republican Party United States senators